Óscar Humberto Castro Rojas (9 April 1953 – 13 April 2015) was a Colombian chess International Master (IM) (1975), six times Colombian Chess Championships winner (1972–1974, 1992, 1994, 1999).

Biography
From the early 1970s to the mid-1990s Óscar Castro was one of the leading Colombian chess players. He won the Colombian Chess Championships 6 times: 1972–1974, 1992, 1994, 1999. In 1976 in Biel, Óscar Castro participated in the World Chess Championship Interzonal Tournament where he ranked in 18th place. In this tournament he beat such chess grandmasters as Tigran Petrosian and Efim Geller.

Óscar Castro participated in international tournaments many times and won 2nd place in Maresme (1976) and shared 2nd place in Linares International Chess Tournament (1979).

Óscar Castro played for Colombia in the Chess Olympiads:
 In 1974, at first board in the 21st Chess Olympiad in Nice (+4, =9, −5),
 In 1976, at second board in the 22nd Chess Olympiad in Haifa (+2, =4, −3),
 In 1980, at third board in the 24th Chess Olympiad in La Valletta (+2, =6, −2),
 In 1990, at third board in the 29th Chess Olympiad in Novi Sad (+7, =3, −3),
 In 1992, at fourth board in the 30th Chess Olympiad in Manila (+5, =5, −2),
 In 1994, at first board in the 31st Chess Olympiad in Moscow (+5, =2, −4).

Óscar Castro played for Colombia in the World Student Team Chess Championship:
 In 1972, at first board in the 19th World Student Team Chess Championship in Graz (+4, =6, −2).

Óscar Castro awarded the International Master (IM) title in 1975.

References

External links

Óscar Castro chess games at 365chess.com

1953 births
2015 deaths
Colombian chess players
Chess International Masters
Chess Olympiad competitors
20th-century chess players